Tumas is a given name and a surname

Tumas may also refer to
Tümas, or Angwusnasomtaka, a spirit in Hopi mythology
Tumas, original name of Dağ Tumas, village in Azerbaijan

See also